Little Green Lake is a lake located in Green Lake County, Wisconsin. Little Green Lake lies just over three miles to the south of Wisconsin's deepest natural lake, Green Lake. Little Green Lake is about a mile north of Markesan.

In 2006, the Wisconsin state record Brown Bullhead was caught in Little Green Lake.

See also
List of lakes of Wisconsin

References

Lakes of Green Lake County, Wisconsin